A Young Man in a Hurry is a collection of short stories by American writer Robert W. Chambers.  A collection of light romantic tales in which Chambers' love of fishing and hunting and natural scenery prevails. The stories are set in America.  The title story is a comedy of coincidence which has an atmospheric setting of nocturnal snow in New York.

Table of contents
"A Young Man in a Hurry"
"A Pilgrim"
"The Shining Band"
"One Man in a Million"
"The Fire-Warden"
"The Market-Hunter"
"The Path-Master"
"In Nauvoo"
"Marlett's Shoes"
"Pasque Florida"

Publication
The collection was originally published by Harper & Brothers, New York City, in 1904. It was published in Britain by Archibald Constable & Co Ltd, London in 1905.

1904 short story collections
Harper & Brothers books